The 1969–70 Georgetown Hoyas men's basketball team represented Georgetown University during the 1969–70 NCAA University Division college basketball season. John Magee coached them in his fourth season as head coach. The team was an independent and played its home games at McDonough Gymnasium on the Georgetown campus in Washington, D.C. It finished the season with a record of 18-7, Magees best record during his six seasons as head coach, and was the last Georgetown team to appear in a post-season tournament until the 1974-75 team played in the 1975 NCAA tournament.

Season recap

Since the 1942-43 teams appearance in the 1943 NCAA Division I men's basketball tournament, Georgetown had only been to the post-season once, when the 1952-53 team went to the 1953 National Invitation Tournament (NIT), after that never contending for the NCAA tournament and always falling short of consideration for the NIT. Georgetowns recent teams had been especially disappointing, losing seven of their final 10 games in the 1964-65 season, eight of their final 11 in the 1966-67 season, and seven of their last nine games in 1968-69, each time squandering a strong start that otherwise might have gotten them into the post-season. However, Coach Magee had higher hopes in 1969-70, with senior center Charlie Adrion, senior guard Mike Laska. and junior guard Don Weber returning and sophomore forwards Andy Gill, Mike Laughna, and Art White joining the varsity squad after a very strong 1968-69 season on the freshman team. Magee was especially excited about White, whom he declared in 1970 to be the "best prospect I have coached, and with the potential to be...the best in Georgetown history before he graduates." A general feeling existed among Georgetown fans that the team had a legitimate shot at a post-season berth, especially in the NIT.

With White consistently scoring in double figures and Laughna beginning the season and his varsity career with a 14-rebound performance against American, the Hoyas went 12-2 in the seasons first 14 games. In an unusual event during this stretch that would prove significant later, they were losing 41-26 on December 18, 1969, in the first half at an 18th-ranked Jacksonville team led by Artis Gilmore when hostile Jacksonville fans flooded onto the court, prompting Magee to pull his team from the game. The games officials ruled it a Georgetown forfeit and gave the Hoyas a loss. Georgetown appealed the decision to the National Collegiate Athletic Association (NCAA), and in February 1970 the NCAA overruled the officials decision and declared the game a "no contest," meaning that neither Georgetown or Jacksonville would be credited with a win or loss for the game.

In late December 1969, Laughna scored a combined 50 points and 31 rebounds against Penn State and Stanford in the Kodak Classic and was declared the Classics Most Valuable Player. In his next game after the Classic, he opened the new year of 1970 with a 19-rebound performance against Holy Cross.

On January 14, 1970, Georgetown defeated longtime rival St. Joseph's 89–80, the Hoyas' first victory over the Hawks since 1967 and only their second since 1956. In a balanced attack, five Hoyas finished in double figures, and the win was crucial to Georgetown's hopes for a postseason tournament bid.

In February, Charlie Adrion had 20 points and 15 rebounds against New York University and five days later scored 20 points at Boston College. Georgetown posted a home record of 12-1, the best in the history of McDonough Gymnasium at the time, and Laughna scored in double figures in 21 of the 25 games he played in, including the final 18 games of the year. Don Weber scored in double figures 15 times, averaging 11.2 points and 3.3 assists per game, and had a career-high 25 points against George Washington.

Despite this, the Hoyas suffered a number of road losses late in the year that again put the teams hopes of a postseason bid in jeopardy, especially a loss to Manhattan at Madison Square Garden in New York City late in the season in which Adrion scored a season-low six points. But Saint Peter's upset Manhattan in the last game of the season while the Hoyas beat Penn State in their last regular-season game, with Laughna scoring 21 points and grabbing 13 rebounds and Adrion scoring 13 points. This left Georgetown with an 18-6 regular-season record and prompted the NIT selection committee to invite the Hoyas to the 1970 NIT, the schools first post-season tournament appearance in 17 years. The December 1969 "no contest" game at Jacksonville played an unforeseen role; if Georgetown had completed and lost that game or if the NCAA had stood by the game officials decision that Georgetown had forfeited, the Hoyas would have finished the regular season at 18-7, and that difference probably would have cost Georgetown its NIT invitation.

The Hoyas faced Louisiana State, led by Pete Maravich, at Madison Square Garden in the first round of the NIT, with CBS televising the game – at a time when there was no regular national television coverage of college basketball – to showcase Maravich. Although Maravich was averaging 45.2 points per game and had scored over 50 points in a game 28 times, Georgetown guard Mike Laska held him to 20 points in a man-to-man defense and Art White scored 28 points, helping Georgetown to come back from seven points down with 3:08 left in the game to close to 81-80 with 17 seconds left. But the Hoyas had to foul Maravich immediately to stop the clock, and he sank both his free throws to give Louisiana State an 83-80 lead. Georgetown closed to 83-82, but ran out of time and was knocked out of the tournament.

White was the Hoyas leading scorer for the year with 15.1 points per game. Laughna finished the season with a team-leading 261 rebounds, averaging 10.4 rebounds per game.

Pleased with the season despite Georgetowns early exit from the NIT, Magee believed that it heralded a new era of success for Georgetown basketball, but it was not to be. The next season, the Hoyas would go a mediocre 12-14, and in Magees final season, 1971-72, they would fall to a dismal 3-23 record. It would take the arrival of John Thompson, Jr., as head coach in 1972-73 for Georgetown to begin its rise to the status of a national basketball power.

The team was not ranked in the Top 20 in the Associated Press Poll or Coaches' Poll at any time.

Roster
Source

1969–70 schedule and results

Sources

|-
!colspan=9 style="background:#002147; color:#8D817B;"| Regular Season

|-
!colspan=9 style="background:#002147; color:#8D817B;"| National Invitation Tournament

Further reading
The Georgetown Basketball History Project: A Glimpse Into the Future

References

Georgetown Hoyas men's basketball seasons
Georgetown
Georgetown
Georgetown Hoyas men's basketball team
Georgetown Hoyas men's basketball team